Mark Lewyn Carman (born September 3, 1960) is an American music producer, singer, songwriter, and social activist.

Career

Music
Carman is known primarily for his role as the musical arranger and co-producer of the Grammy nominated album by country music artist T. Graham Brown, "Forever Changed". The album features guest performances by other well known artists including Leon Russell, Vince Gill, The Oak Ridge Boys, Jason Crabb and others. The recording musicians for the album represented an all-star lineup of musicians. Included among them are notable musicians; David Hungate (bass guitar), Brent Mason (electric guitar), Steve Cropper (electric guitar), Jim Horn (saxophone).

Activism
In 2015 Carman involved himself in public efforts related to gun control and other social issues by releasing an internet video that garnered more than 1.5 million views in the first week of publication. As part of that effort, Carman founded an activist group, the American Coalition for Responsible Gun Ownership, and made several contributory appearances on national news programs including CNN and CBC News addressing firearms legislation in the United States. Carman's efforts drove the acquisition of more than 1,000,000 signatures on a petition, delivered to Senator Chuck Schumer urging President Barack Obama to use executive order to address some of the issues pertaining to firearms legislation.

In January 2016, Carman was invited to the White House to participate in the announcement of President Obama's executive action on gun control.

Awards
In 2012 Carman was awarded the President's Call to Service Award (also referred to the President's Lifetime Achievement Award). The Call to Service Award is the most prestigious President's Volunteer Service Award. It has been awarded to only a few Americans for extraordinary service. Among the honorees are S. Truett Cathy, Zach Bonner, Brandon Pugh, Thomas Smith, Timothy Mayer, Thomas Crilly and Stanley Williams). In 2016 Carman was awarded the President's Volunteer Service Award, Gold level, for his volunteer efforts involving public service to orphaned children and homeless adults.

Albums
1988 – Heartland - Heartland (producer, artist, composer, keyboards)
1989 – You and The Horse Your Rode in On – Patsy Cole (producer, composer)
1989 – Southern Frame of Mind – Heath Locklear (producer, composer)
2006 – It Is What It Is – Steven Hall (producer, composer)
2007 – Lo Mejor De Mi – Johnny Vasquez (producer, composer)
2007 – She's an Army of One – Various Artists (producer, vocals, keyboards, composer, primary artist)
2010 – Grace (producer, composer) – Palmetto State Quartet
2011 – I'm in Him, He's in Me – Marty Raybon and Various Artists (producer, composer)
2011 – Mom's Amazing Grace – Mark Templeton (producer, composer)
2012 – Hand to the Plow – Marty Raybon (producer)
2012 – Working on a Building – Trace Adkins, Marty Raybon, T. Graham Brown, Jimmy Fortune, Alan Jackson, George Jones, Glen Campbell, Jason Crabb, Aaron Tippin (producer, composer)
2013 – Follow – Cindy Hughlett (producer)
2013 - We Were Young - The Hunts (Producer)
2014 – Forever Changed – T. Graham Brown, Leon Russell, The Oak Ridge Boys, Vince Gill, The Booth Brothers, (producer) Grammy Nomination
2014 – Something Old-Something New – Cindy Hughlett (producer)
2015 – Trust Me – Cindy Hughlett (producer)
2015 – The Wretch – Mark Carman (producer, artist, piano)
2015 – Carry the Message – Steve Hess and Southern Salvation (executive producer)
2015 – On Top of the Covers – Justin Robinette (executive producer)
2015 – Smallest Gifts – Kenzie Walker (producer)
2016 – Reflections – Cindy Hughlett (producer, keyboards, arranger)
2016 – Careful Where You Step – Mark Carman (producer, artist, piano)
2016 – Streets – Rie Sanchez (producer, composer, keyboards)
2017 – Mississippi – Kate Stedelbauer (producer, piano, harmonica, keyboards)

References

External links
 

1960 births
American male singer-songwriters
American country singer-songwriters
Living people
People from Beckley, West Virginia
Country musicians from West Virginia
Record producers from West Virginia
Southern Baptist ministers
Musicians from West Virginia
People from Joliet, Illinois
People from West Virginia
Singer-songwriters from West Virginia